Ishwar Chand Nanda (30 September 1892 - 3 September 1965) was an Indian dramatist. He is known as the father of Punjabi drama.

Life
He did B.A. Honors from Dayal Singh College, Lahore, where he was a student of Norah Richards, and then M.A. English from Punjab University, Lahore. He later became a Professor at Dayal Singh College, where he worked till his retirement on August 15, 1947. After partition settled in New Delhi, where he lived for the rest of life.

Works

Plays
 Suhag or Dulhan (1913) one-act play
 Bebe Ram Bhajni (1914)
 Subhaddra (1920)
 Var Ghar or Lily Da Viah (1930)
 Shamu Shah (1928)k
 Social Circle (1953) three one-act plays

References

1892 births
1965 deaths
Indian male dramatists and playwrights
Punjabi-language writers
University of the Punjab alumni
20th-century Indian dramatists and playwrights
People from Lahore
20th-century Indian male writers